The Fast5 Netball World Series is an international Fast5 netball competition that was contested for the first time in October 2009. The new competition features modified Fast5 rules, and has been likened to Twenty20 cricket and rugby sevens. The competition is contested by the six top national netball teams in the world, according to the INF World Rankings.

Background 
Before 2008, the major competitions in international netball were the quadrennial Netball World Championships (renamed Netball World Cup in 2015) and the netball event of the quadrennial Commonwealth Games. First-tier national teams also participated in yearly test series, with others playing in regional events. However, several significant changes in international netball occurred in 2008. Changes to international test rules were finalised at a World Netball (WN) congress in Auckland in 2007, and progressively rolled out across netball-playing countries the following year. WN also introduced a new world rankings system to compare the performances of national teams. In England, a campaign was started advocating netball's inclusion in the Olympic Games, as a demonstration sport in 2012 and potentially as a competitive sport from 2016. In the Southern Hemisphere, the sport attained semi-professional status in Australia and New Zealand with the introduction of the ANZ Championship.

Also, in December 2008 a new international netball competition was announced, the World Netball Series, to be contested in 2009 under modified rules. The new rules had been trialed by England junior and senior squads over a 12-month period. DVDs were sent to coaches of the participating teams for consultation. Some of the new rules were announced in December 2008, including six-minute playing quarters and power plays; others were announced in February 2009.

Prior to the 2012 edition the rules were revamped and renamed Fast5.

Format 
The competition is held over two days, and is played under Fast5 rules. Each team plays each other once during the first two days in a round-robin format. The four highest-scoring teams from this stage progress to the finals, played on the final day of competition, in which the 1st-ranked team plays the 4th-ranked team, while 2nd plays 3rd. The winners of these two matches contest the Grand Final; the remaining teams contest the third- and fifth-place playoffs.

Venues 
The first three editions of the tournament were held in England. Initially, Manchester was to host all three seasons in England at the MEN Arena. The venue is the largest indoor arena in Europe, capable of seating around 20,000 spectators. However, the 2010 tournament was held in Liverpool at the Echo Arena, as was the 2011 tournament.

Results

Organisation 
The World Netball Series is organised by a local organizing committee and overseen by World Netball, in conjunction with the national governing bodies of the six competing nations each year.

Reception 
Australian coach Norma Plummer greeted the new tournament positively: "If you want your sport to keep growing these days, it's got to become up with the times and keep having innovations that make the game exciting for not only the players, but all the spectators." But Plummer also expressed some reservations about power plays being used against substantially weaker teams, and also about penalty shootouts and the new centre pass rule.

Netball New Zealand (NNZ) Chief Executive Raelene Castle stated that she was "excited about what the new competition could bring to the ever-increasing profile of Netball internationally". However, Castle also acknowledged that the shortened version of the game "may not be for everyone". New Zealand netball and basketball player Donna Wilkins also stated her concerns about the sport becoming too similar to basketball.

References

External links 
 
 Past results from the INF
 WNS Coverage from NetballOnline.com
  World Netball Series Images

 
International netball competitions
Recurring sporting events established in 2009
Fast5 netball